The 1924 Anhalt state elections may refer to

June 1924 Anhalt state election
November 1924 Anhalt state election